The Elizabeth Lookout is a historic lookout tower on János Hill (Hungarian: János-hegy) above Budapest. Built in 1911, the tower was named after Empress Elisabeth, wife of Emperor Franz Joseph I. Frigyes Schulek was the architect. The tower is near Budapest's District XII, and may be reached from the Széll Kálmán tér of Budapest. At first, there was a low wooden platform, which was demolished. After that, Frederick Gluck had an idea, to raise a stone tower and then he started gathering investors for the project. Budapest city approved the project in 1907 and Schulek Frederick received the commission to build the tower. The construction started in 1908 and Paul Kluczinger was the construction manager. The tower was built from haraszti limestone. The lookout was named after Queen Elizabeth, who visited the mountain in 1882.

Buda hills
At  , János-hegy is the highest point in Budapest. In clear weather, the Mátra Mountains are visible,  distant. On the far eastern horizon one might see the Great Hungarian Plain (Hungarian: Nagyalföld).

See also
Hárshegy

References

External links 
 Airplane shots of The Belvedere (Elisabeth) Tower
 Climbing the buda hills
 70 Billion Pixels Budapest - The largest photo on Earth

Buildings and structures in Budapest
Buildings and structures completed in 1911
Tourist attractions in Budapest